Motbeg (also Romanized as Moṭbeg; also known as Modbeg-e Ḩaqīqat) is a village in Abdoliyeh-ye Gharbi Rural District, in the Central District of Ramshir County, Khuzestan Province, Iran. At the 2006 census, its population was 260, in 46 families.

References 

Populated places in Ramshir County